The 6-Day Race became a standard footrace distance in the 1870s and was a popular form of entertainment with up to 70,000 paying visitors during such a Pedestrians event. However the widespread use of the bicycle from 1890 caused it to be replaced as spectator sport by cycle races of the same duration.  It was in two forms: strict "heel-and-toe" racewalking,  or "go-as-you-please" combination of walking, jogging, running.

History
In 1773, Foster Powell, of England, started the focus on walking/running for six days when he walked from London to York and back, in six days and is considered the “Father of the Six-Day Race.” The first six-day race in history was put on by P.T. Barnum of circus fame, in his New York City Hippodrome on March 1, 1875, between Edward Payson Weston and "Professor" John R. Judd. The first six-day race between women was held in 1876, in Chicago Illinois, between Bertha Von Hillern and Mary Marshall.
In a re-match between Weston and O'Leary in 1877, O'Leary was victorious again and the excitement created enough interest for Sir John Dugdale Astley, a British Member of Parliament, to inaugurate a series of 6 day races to determine the "Long distance Champion of The World". These became known as the "Astley Belt" races and cash prizes were offered. O'Leary won the first two and was thwarted by Charles Rowell in his quest for three in a row.

The 1879 World Championship

Results 

Intermediate results:
 24 hours: Guyon 105 miles; Faber 100; Byrne 95; Washington 93.5; Krohne 91; Campana 86; Colston 82; Curran 80; Urann 78; Kent 75; Forrester 67.5; Davis 60. Retired:  Cotton (60) and Stark (52).
 48 hours: Guyon 187 miles; Faber 178; Krohne 172; Campana 165; Washington 161; Curran 159; Colston 150; Kent 142; Forrester 118; Davis 102. Retired: Byrne (104) and Urann.
 72 hours: Guyon 267 miles; Krohne 254; Faber 250; Campana 236; Colston 226; Curran 224; Washington 213; Kent 211; Davis 152
 96 hours: Guyon 345 miles; Krohne 335; Faber 314; Colston 300; Curran 296; Campana 292; Davis 188.

In 1880, Frank Hart set a new record of  earning $17,000 dollars, a fortune at the time.

Between 26 November and 1 December 1888, George Littlewood of Sheffield, England, created a new world record of 623 miles 1,320 yards—a record that wasn't beaten for 96 years.

By the early 1890s the six-day races were in decline and no longer drawing the public or offering large prizes. They were discontinued by 1903 because local laws were passed to disallow amusement events lasting more than a day.

It wasn't until Don Choi hosted a 6-day race on July 4, 1980. at Woodside California that interest began to grow again. Briton Mike Newton became the first man to cover 500 miles/800 km in a modern 6-day race at Nottingham in November 1981. In 1982, Tom O'Reilly took the 6-day total to 576 miles/927 km.

Current 6-Day Races
6 Days in The Dome
6 Jours de France
Across the Years
Australian 6 Day Race
Antibes 6 Day Race (Now known as  6 Jours de France)
Arizona 6 Day
Athens 6 Day Race
British Ultra Fest
No Finish Line 6 Day
6 DAYS UMF Italian UltraMarathon Festival
Self-Transcendence 6 day
South Africa 6 Day Circuit
Three Days At The Fair (2017
Unixsport 6 Day International Ultramarathon Challenge
Hallsberg 6 Day (Sweden)
Viadal Ultra Six Days (Sweden)

References

External links
Davy Crockett The Six-Day Race
Andy Milroy Yiannis Kouros – The Making of a Legend
Andy Milroy The events and performances that have shaped ultrarunning
Kelly Collins – The History of Multiday Running
6 Jours D'Antibes.com
Self-Transcendence
Erkrath
Multiday races
ULTRAmarathonRunning.com Global Ultramarathon Races & Events Calendar
King of the Peds

Literature
Ultramarathoning: The Next Challenge, by Tom Osler and Ed Dodd
Ultrarunning magazine
Multiday Running Magazine
King of the Peds, by P.S. Marshall

Multiday races
Racewalking